Edwin Ronald Barnes (6 February 19356 February 2019) was a British Roman Catholic priest and a former Church of England bishop. He was the Anglican Bishop of Richborough from 1995 to 2001 and was also formerly the president of the Church Union.

Anglican ministry
Barnes was educated at Plymouth College and Pembroke College, Oxford. He began his ministry with a curacy at St Mark's North End, Portsmouth. After this he held incumbencies at Farncombe and Hessle. In 1987 he became Principal of St Stephen's House, Oxford, an Anglican theological college. He was made a deacon on Trinity Sunday 1960 (12 June) and ordained a priest the next Trinity Sunday (28 May 1961), both times by John Phillips, Anglican Bishop of Portsmouth, at Portsmouth Cathedral. In 1995 he was chosen to be the first Bishop of Richborough, a provincial episcopal visitor in the Province of Canterbury, and consecrated a bishop at Westminster Abbey on 20 July 1995. He retired in 2001.

Reception into the Catholic Church
In October 2010, Barnes was interviewed by The Tablet magazine on the possibility of joining the proposed personal ordinariate in the Roman Catholic Church for former Anglicans (which was established as the Personal Ordinariate of Our Lady of Walsingham in January 2011). He said that he wanted to join "because the Anglican Church is no longer the one holy and apostolic Church it says it is." On 6 January 2011, Barnes announced that he intended being received into the Catholic Church.

On 21 January 2011 he and his wife, Jane, were received into the Catholic Church at the Church of Our Lady & St Joseph, Lymington by Monsignor Peter Ryan, himself a former Anglican. He was ordained to the diaconate on 11 February 2011 in the domestic chapel at Bishop's House, Portsmouth by Crispian Hollis, Roman Catholic Bishop of Portsmouth. He was ordained to the priesthood on 5 March 2011 by the same bishop in the Cathedral of St John the Evangelist, Portsmouth, for the Personal Ordinariate of Our Lady of Walsingham. In June 2012 he was elevated to the rank of monsignor as a Chaplain of His Holiness.

Illness and Death
Barnes died on 6 February 2019 on his 84th birthday, following a short illness.

References

 
 

1935 births
2019 deaths
People educated at Plymouth College
Alumni of Pembroke College, Oxford
Bishops of Richborough
20th-century Church of England bishops
Anglo-Catholic bishops
Anglican bishop converts to Roman Catholicism
21st-century British Roman Catholic priests
Principals of St Stephen's House, Oxford
English Anglo-Catholics
People of the personal ordinariates